The Buke of the Howlat, often referred to simply as The Howlat, is a humorous 15th century Scots poem by Richard Holland.

Description
The poem is a comic allegory in which all the characters are birds with human attributes, with a howlet, or owl, the protagonist. The symbolism is debatable but two of its purposes are clear; it serves as a moral fable warning against vanity and excessive pride, and it is also a piece of propaganda praising the Douglas dynasty of Scots nobles.

Other themes dealt with in the work include satire of the bureaucracy of the medieval church, and the mocking of Highland Scots and their language.

The Howlat is a long, narrative piece full of exuberant comic detail. It is written in rhyming verse heavy with alliteration.  The text is preserved in the Asloan and Bannatyne manuscripts. A printed transcript, based mainly on the Asloan text was published by the Bannatyne Club in 1823.

Synopsis

An owl, unhappy with his appearance, decides to appeal to the Pope (a peacock), to be made more handsome.  The Pope, assisted by his secretary (a turtledove) and his herald (a swallow) calls a council to discuss the matter. Church dignitaries assemble first, followed by lay representatives led by the Emperor, an eagle. 

A long interlude of praise for the Douglas family follows. It includes a retelling of the career of Sir James Douglas.

The narrative resumes with the Pope holding a banquet for his guests. A series of entertainers are presented in vivid comic detail; The mavis leads a band of musicians; the jay performs juggling; the rook, as a highland bard, gives a recitation in mock Gaelic before being driven out by two fools (a peewit and a gowk). The fools then quarrel with each other.

After the feast, the council agrees to meet the owl's request and, after praying to Dame Nature she descends from heaven and arranges a beautiful new plumage for the owl. Each of the assembled birds is required to give up one of his feathers.

Due to his grand new appearance, the owl becomes extremely arrogant and the birds pray again to Dame Nature; this time they request that the owl's gift be revoked. Nature agrees and, deprived of his fine plumage, the owl reflects bitterly on the lesson he has learnt about pride and vanity.

Representative passage

The following stanzas describe some of the entertainment at the birds' feast. They open with the entrance of the bard, who demands food and drink in exchange for his recitation on Irish royal genealogy. He speaks a mixture of mock Gaelic and pidgin Scots.

The bard is heckled by the Rural Dean a raven, but then gives as good as he gets in a Scots which is suddenly very eloquent. The blushing raven retires from the stage.

The Bard is then unceremoniously ejected from the hall by two fools.

References

Scottish poems
Medieval poetry
Scots-language works
Fables
Humorous poems
15th century in Scotland
15th-century poems
Poetry of the Bannatyne Manuscript
Middle Scots poems